Javier "Javy" Ayala (born August 22, 1988) is an American mixed martial artist currently competing in Bellator's Heavyweight division. A professional competitor since 2011, he has also competed for Tachi Palace Fights.

Background
Born and raised in Porterville, California, Ayala began wrestling in the seventh grade. Ayala continued with the sport at Porterville High School, where he also competed in track and field. running the 100-meter dash, as well as throwing the discus and shot put. Ayala began his MMA career around 12 years old.

Mixed martial arts career

Early career
Ayala made his professional mixed martial arts debut in 2011 and compiled a record of 5-3, while competing on the regional circuit in California for promotions such as Tachi Palace Fights.

Bellator MMA
Ayala signed a three-fight contract with Bellator and made his promotional debut at Bellator 102 in Visalia, California on October 4, 2013, against Thiago dos Santos. Ayala won in an upset, knocking out the Brazilian fighter with a series of punches as the first round ended, causing referee John McCarthy to call off the fight.

After the fight, Ayala's contract was updated to six fights and he faced off against Eric Prindle at Bellator 111 on March 7, 2014. Ayala won via TKO due to a doctor stoppage in the third round, after dominating the first two rounds.

Ayala faced undefeated Raphael Butler on September 19, 2014, at Bellator 125. He won the fight via submission in the first round.

Ayala faced Alex Huddleston at Bellator 139 on June 26, 2015. He lost the fight via submission in the first round.

Ayala faced Carl Seumanutafa at Bellator 148 on January 29, 2016. He lost the fight via TKO in the second round.

Ayala returned to face Roy Boughton at Bellator 156 on June 17, 2016. He won the fight via TKO in the first round.

In his highest profile bout to date, Ayala faced Sergei Kharitonov at Bellator 163 on November 4, 2016. Despite being a significant underdog, Ayala won the fight via knockout just sixteen seconds into the first round.

Ayala faced debuting heavyweight Roy Nelson at Bellator 183 on September 23, 2017. He lost the fight by unanimous decision.

Ayala faced Cheick Kongo at Bellator 199 on May 12 in San Jose, CA. He lost the fight via knockout in the first round.

In his highest profile match to date, Ayala faced former UFC Heavyweight champion Frank Mir at Bellator 212 on December 14, 2018. After being taken down and controlled on the ground in the first round, Ayala rallied in the second round to win via TKO after Mir tapped to punches.

Ayala was to face former Bellator Heavyweight champion Vitaly Minakov at Bellator 225 on August 24, 2019. However, on the day of the fight, it was announced that Ayala was pulled from the fight by the Connecticut Boxing Commission due to an undisclosed medical reason and was replaced by Tim Johnson. 

Ayala was re-scheduled to meet Minakov at Bellator 232 on October 26, 2019. However, Minakov was unable to obtain visa for the bout, leading to Ayala being pulled from the card also.

Ayala faced Valentin Moldavsky at Bellator 239 on February 21, 2020. After being taken down and dominated on the ground, he lost the fight by unanimous decision.

Personal life
Ayala is married and has two children.
He is the cousin of former UFC Bantamweight fighter Joe Soto.

Championships and accomplishments
 Bellator MMA
 Tied (with Tyrell Fortune) for most stoppage wins in Bellator heavyweight division history (six)

Mixed martial arts record

|-
|Loss
|align=center|11–8
|Valentin Moldavsky
|Decision (unanimous) 
|Bellator 239
|
|align=center|3
|align=center|5:00
|Thackerville, Oklahoma, United States
|
|-
|Win
|align=center|11–7
|Frank Mir
|TKO (submission to punches)
|Bellator 212
|
|align=center|2
|align=center|4:30
|Honolulu, Hawaii, United States
|
|-
|Loss
|align=center|10–7
|Cheick Kongo
|KO (punches)
|Bellator 199
|
|align=center|1
|align=center|2:29
|San Jose, California, United States
|
|-
|Loss
|align=center|10–6
|Roy Nelson
|Decision (unanimous)
|Bellator 183
|
|align=center|3
|align=center|5:00
|San Jose, California, United States
|
|-
| Win
| align=center| 10–5
| Sergei Kharitonov
| KO (punch)
| Bellator 163
| 
| align=center|1
| align=center| 0:16
| Uncasville, Connecticut, United States
|
|-
| Win
| align=center| 9–5
| Roy Boughton
| TKO (punches)
| Bellator 156
| 
| align=center| 1
| align=center| 3:02
| Fresno, California, United States
| 
|-
| Loss
| align=center| 8–5
| Carl Seumanutafa
| TKO (punches)
| Bellator 148
| 
| align=center| 2
| align=center| 3:46
| Fresno, California, United States
| 
|-
| Loss
| align=center| 8–4
| Alex Huddleston
| Submission (rear-naked choke)
| Bellator 139
| 
| align=center| 1
| align=center| 1:12
| Mulvane, Kansas, United States
| 
|-
| Win
| align=center| 8–3
| Raphael Butler
| Submission (rear-naked choke)
| Bellator 125
| 
| align=center| 1
| align=center| 1:03
| Fresno, California, United States
| 
|-
| Win
| align=center| 7–3
| Eric Prindle
| TKO (doctor stoppage)
| Bellator 111
| 
| align=center| 3
| align=center| 3:05
| Thackerville, Oklahoma, United States
| 
|-
| Win
| align=center| 6–3
| Thiago dos Santos
| KO (punches)
| Bellator 102
| 
| align=center| 1
| align=center| 5:00
| Visalia, California, United States
| 
|-
| Loss
| align=center| 5–3
| Carl Seumanutafa
| TKO (punches)
| DH: Dragon House 13
| 
| align=center| 1
| align=center| 3:00
| Oakland, California, United States
| 
|-
| Win
| align=center| 5–2
| Mike Cook
| Submission (rear-naked choke)
| TWC 16: The Condemned
| 
| align=center| 1
| align=center| 0:34
| Porterville, California, United States
| 
|-
| Loss
| align=center| 4–2
| Freddie Aquitania
| Decision (split)
| TPF 15: Collision Course
| 
| align=center| 3
| align=center| 5:00
| Lemoore, California, United States
| 
|-
| Loss
| align=center| 4–1
| Brandon Cash
| KO (punch)
| UPC Unlimited: Up and Comers 12: Turning Point
| 
| align=center| 1
| align=center| 0:31
| Coarsegold, California, United States
| 
|-
| Win
| align=center| 4–0
| C.J. Leveque
| Submission (kneebar)
| CCFC: The Return
| 
| align=center| 1
| align=center| 1:37
| Santa Rosa, California, United States
| 
|-
| Win
| align=center| 3–0
| Freddie Aquitania
| Decision (split)
| TPF 11: Redemption
| 
| align=center| 3
| align=center| 5:00
| Lemoore, California, United States
| 
|-
| Win
| align=center| 2–0
| Ray Castaneda
| TKO (punches)
| TWC 11: Inferno
| 
| align=center| 1
| align=center| 1:33
| Porterville, California, United States
| 
|-
| Win
| align=center| 1–0
| Gary LaFranchi
| TKO (submission to punches)
| TWC 10: Beatdown
| 
| align=center| 1
| align=center| 0:41
| Porterville, California, United States
|

See also
 List of current Bellator fighters
 List of male mixed martial artists

References

External links
 

Living people
1988 births
American male mixed martial artists
Heavyweight mixed martial artists
Mixed martial artists utilizing wrestling
Mixed martial artists from California
People from Porterville, California